The 2015–16 Biathlon World Cup – Individual Women started on Thursday December 3, 2015 in Östersund and finished on March 9, 2016 at the World Championships in Holmenkollen. The defending titlist Kaisa Mäkäräinen of Finland finished on the 8th place. Dorothea Wierer of Italy won the title.

Competition format
The  individual race is the oldest biathlon event; the distance is skied over five laps. The biathlete shoots four times at any shooting lane, in the order of prone, standing, prone, standing, totalling 20 targets. For each missed target a fixed penalty time, usually one minute, is added to the skiing time of the biathlete. Competitors' starts are staggered, normally by 30 seconds.

2014–15 Top 3 Standings

Medal winners

Standings

References

Individual Women